Angel (Chinese title: 天使行動; aka Angels, Fighting Madam (USA), Iron Angels, Midnight Angels) is a 1987 Hong Kong action film inspired by Charlie's Angels which stars Moon Lee and Yukari Oshima. It is regarded as defining the girls with guns subgenre.  The film was followed by two sequels.

Plot
After Interpol destroys a mass of Thai opium fields, the drug lords strike back by viciously murdering the officers in charge of the drug raid. In response, the cops hire the mercenary Angel Organization whose leader, John (David Chiang), sends crack agents—Angel #01 Saijo (Hideki Saijo), Moon (Moon Lee) and Elaine (Elaine Lui). Their first act is to seize a massive drug shipment with the help of an American secret operative, Commander Alex Fong (Alex Fong). This inevitably invokes the rage of frighteningly fierce Madam Yeung (Yukari Oshima) who recently grabbed the mantel of power after killing her predecessor. After a series of tussles with Madam Yeung, Saijo finds himself buried alive in an armored car while Moon and Elaine settle their score with their nemesis kung fu style.

Cast
 Yukari Oshima 
 Moon Lee
 Elaine Lui
 Hideki Saijo 
 Alex Fong
 Hwang Jang-Lee
 David Chiang
 Lin Chung
 Wang Hsieh
 Andy Dai
 Chan Sing

References

External links

 
 Hong Kong Cinemagic entry
 loveHKfilm entry

1987 films
1980s Cantonese-language films
1987 martial arts films
1987 action films
Girls with guns films
Hong Kong martial arts films
1980s Hong Kong films